Amy Ridge (born 15 August 1996 in Sydney) is an Australian water polo player who is a member of the Australia women's national water polo team. She was part of the team at the 2017 World Aquatics Championships, 2018 FINA World Cup, 2019 World Aquatics Championships, and 2019 FINA Women's Water Polo World League.

She played for University of New South Wales's water polo team, and University of Michigan's women's water polo team.

Ridge was a member of the Australian Stingers squad that competed at the Tokyo 2020 Olympics. The Head Coach was Predrag Mihailović. By finishing second in their pool, the Aussie Stingers went through to the quarterfinals. They were beaten 8-9 by Russia and therefore did not compete for an Olympic medal. Australia at the 2020 Summer Olympics details the team's performance in depth.

References

External links 
 Amy Ridge, swimswam
 

1996 births
Living people
Australian female water polo players
Water polo players from Sydney
Water polo players at the 2020 Summer Olympics
Olympic water polo players of Australia
20th-century Australian women
21st-century Australian women